Robert Arrak (born 1 April 1999) is an Estonian professional ice hockey centre for Cracovia of the Polska Hokej Liga (PHL). 

Arrak also represents Estonia in international hockey competitions.

Playing career
On 29 March 2018, Arrak signed a one-year contract, with an option of extension for another season, with Sport of the Liiga. He made his Liiga debut on 14 September 2018, in a 4–2 victory over Pelicans. He played four games for Sport before being loaned to Hermes of the second-tier Mestis in November 2018.

International play
Arrak debuted internationally for the Estonia under-18 team at the 2014 World U18 Championships. He recorded three goals and one assist as the team won the Division II Group B tournament.

Arrak first played for the senior team at the 2018 Winter Olympics qualifying tournament.

Career statistics

Regular season and playoffs

International

References

External links
 

1999 births
Cedar Rapids RoughRiders players
Estonian expatriate sportspeople in Finland
Estonian expatriate sportspeople in the United States
Estonian ice hockey centres
Kiekko-Vantaa players
Kokkolan Hermes players
Living people
Sportspeople from Tallinn
Vaasan Sport players
Estonian expatriate ice hockey people
Expatriate ice hockey players in Finland
Expatriate ice hockey players in the United States
Expatriate ice hockey players in Poland
Expatriate ice hockey players in Austria
Estonian expatriate sportspeople in Austria
Estonian expatriate sportspeople in Poland